The Santiago Island giant tortoise (Chelonoidis niger darwini), also known commonly as the Santiago giant tortoise and the James Island tortoise, is a subspecies of Galápagos tortoise in the family Testudinidae. The subspecies is endemic to Santiago Island (also known as James Island and San Salvador) in the Galápagos.

Population history
Large numbers of C. n. darwini were removed from Santiago Island in the early 19th century by whaling vessels, and introduced goats reduced the coastal lowlands to deserts, restricting the remaining tortoises to the interior. The sex ratio is strongly imbalanced in favour of the males, and most nests and young are destroyed by feral pigs. Some nests are now protected by lava corrals, and since 1970, eggs have been transported to the Charles Darwin Research Station for hatching and rearing. Release programs and measures for nest protection from feral pigs have been successful. There are approximately 1,165 individuals in the wild, with an increasing population.

Habitat
The preferred natural habitats of C. n. darwini are forest and shrubland.

Description
The gray to black carapace of C. n. darwini is intermediate in shape between the saddle-backed subspecies and the domed subspecies of Galápagos tortoises. It has only a shallow cervical indentation. The anterior carapacial rim is not appreciably upturned, and the posterior marginals are flared, slightly upturned, and slightly serrated.

Diet
C. n. darwini grazes on low-growing vegetation.

Etymology
The specific name, darwini, is in honor of English naturalist Charles Darwin.

References

External links
Van Denburgh J (1907). "Expedition of the California Academy of Sciences to the Galapagos Islands, 1905–1906. I. Preliminary descriptions of four new races of gigantic land tortoises from the Galapagos Islands". Proceedings of the California Academy of Sciences, Fourth Series 1: 1–6. (Testudo darwini, new subspecies). (Full text).

Chelonoidis
Subspecies
Taxa named by John Van Denburgh
Endemic reptiles of the Galápagos Islands
Reptiles described in 1907